The Steuart, later Seton-Steuart Baronetcy, of Allanton in the County of Lanark, was a title in the Baronetage of the United Kingdom. It was created on 22 May 1815 for Henry Steuart with special remainder to his son-in-law Reginald Macdonald. The second Baronet assumed the additional surname of Seton. The title became extinct on the death of the fifth Baronet in 1930.

Steuart, later Seton-Steuart baronets, of Allanton (1815)

Sir Henry Steuart, 1st Baronet of Allanton and Touch (1759–1836)
Sir Reginald Macdonald Seton-Steuart, 2nd Baronet (died 1838)
Sir Henry James Seton-Steuart, 3rd Baronet (1812–1884)
Sir Alan Henry Seton-Steuart, 4th Baronet (1856–1913)
Sir Douglas Archibald Seton-Steuart, 5th Baronet (1857–1930)

References

Extinct baronetcies in the Baronetage of the United Kingdom
Baronetcies created with special remainders